Katrina Seymour (born 7 January 1993) is a Bahamian athlete competing in the 400 metres and 400 metres hurdles. She competed in the 4 × 400 metres relay at the 2009 and 2015 World Championships without qualifying for the final.

International competitions

1Disqualified in the final

Personal bests
Outdoor
400 metres – 54.89 (Clermont 2009)
400 metres hurdles – 55.69 (Gold Coast 2017) NR

References

External links

1993 births
Living people
Bahamian female sprinters
Bahamian female hurdlers
World Athletics Championships athletes for the Bahamas
Athletes (track and field) at the 2011 Pan American Games
Athletes (track and field) at the 2015 Pan American Games
Athletes (track and field) at the 2019 Pan American Games
Pan American Games competitors for the Bahamas
Athletes (track and field) at the 2014 Commonwealth Games
Athletes (track and field) at the 2018 Commonwealth Games
Commonwealth Games competitors for the Bahamas
Competitors at the 2018 Central American and Caribbean Games
Place of birth missing (living people)